Antônio Austregésilo (April 21, 1876 – December 23, 1960), was a Brazilian neurologist important to the history of the field in his nation.

Austregésilo was born in Pernambuco. He helped build the first neurological school in Rio de Janeiro. He was a member of the Academia Brasileira de Letras and a President of the Academia Nacional de Medicina.

References 

Brazilian neurologists
People from Pernambuco
1876 births
1960 deaths